Ashton International College is a South African English-medium private school with two branches, situated in Benoni, Gauteng (Ekurhuleni) and Ballito (KwaDukuza), Kwa-Zulu Natal. The College's motto is Sedulis Praestantia (Excellence Belongs to the Zealous).

History
The Ashton Senior College was founded on 13 December 1996 by Mr Andre Buys and opened its doors to its founder students in January 1998. In 2002, the Ashton Junior College opened.

Management
The junior and senior college principals of the Benoni branch are Ms G. Testa and Ms L. Felix, respectively.

Structure
Ashton International College consists of three units: a pre-primary (a.k.a. kindergarten), junior college (from Grade 1 to 7) and a senior college (from Form 1/Grade 8 to Form 5/Grade 12).

Facilities 
The Benoni branch of Ashton International College boasts the following facilities:
 Rhinoturf sports field;
 25m swimming pool;
 Three biology and three science laboratories;
 Computer laboratory with 3-D printing capabilities;
 Tuckshop;
 Junior music room with marimbas and piano; and an
 Auditorium.

Curriculum
The Senior College offers curricula and examinations from the Cambridge and Independent Examinations Board, with the former being the most encouraged. Grade 8/Form 1 students are required to take a mixture of the syllabi, before choosing which curriculum and subjects they would like to take in the next year.

External links
 

Educational institutions established in 1996
1996 establishments in South Africa
Cambridge schools in South Africa
Private schools in Gauteng
Private schools in KwaZulu-Natal
Ekurhuleni
KwaDukuza Local Municipality